Silvia Disderi (born 10 July 1983) is an Italian former professional tennis player.

Career
Disderi grew up in the northern Italian town of Biella, where she began playing tennis at the age of seven, after being introduced to the sport by her father Sergio. When she was 12, she moved to Turin for training. In 1999, she represented Italy in the World Youth Cup, held in Australia.

Professional career
A right-handed player, Disderi began competing on the ITF Women's Circuit in 1999. She reached her best singles ranking in 2002, of 329 in the world. As a doubles player, she was ranked as high as No. 196 and won 12 ITF titles. On the WTA Tour, she made most of her main-draw appearances at the Internazionali Femminili di Palermo, featuring three times in either the singles or doubles draw. She was a doubles quarterfinalist at the 2007 Morocco Open.

In 2009, she retired from professional tennis.
She lives in Boca Raton, Florida, working as a coach at the Rick Macci Tennis Academy.

ITF Circuit finals

Singles: 6 (2–4)

Doubles: 25 (12–13)

References

External links
 
 

1983 births
Living people
Italian female tennis players
People from Biella
Sportspeople from the Province of Biella
Italian expatriate sportspeople in the United States
21st-century Italian women